Ilie Pintilie (1903, Iași – 10 November 1940, Doftana) was a Romanian communist railroad worker and activist of the Romanian Communist Party (PCR).

Pintilie joined the labour movement as an apprentice at the CFR workrooms in Nicolina-Iași, and became a member of the then-outlawed PCR in 1926. In February 1933, as the Griviţa Strike unfolded in Bucharest, he took part in organising railway strikes elsewhere (particularly in Iași and Pașcani) as a member of the national action committee. Between 1934 and 1937 he undertook important tasks in the leadership of CFR unions and was an active member of the anti-war movement, writing numerous articles in left-wing newspapers and magazines. In 1936 he became a member of the Central Committee of the PCR. Arrested, tried and sent to prison several times for his activities, he was detained at Galata (Iași), Suceava and Jilava before being sent to Doftana prison. There, as an ethnic Romanian and a worker, he was the only rival for leadership of Gheorghe Gheorghiu-Dej, who had made a name for himself in the Grivița Strike. Pintilie was killed when Doftana prison collapsed during the 1940 Vrancea earthquake. Later, he was buried in the crypt in the Carol Park Mausoleum; his remains were interred elsewhere when the Mausoleum was shut down in 1991. During the Communist period, a large number of streets bore his name, including Bucharest's Ilie Pintilie Boulevard, formerly Bonaparte Highway and called Iancu de Hunedoara Boulevard since the Romanian Revolution of 1989.

Notes

References
 Romanian Academy (1962–66). Dicţionar enciclopedic român, volume 3. Academia Republicii Populare Române, p. 755.

1903 births
1940 deaths
Romanian communists
Prisoners who died in Romanian detention
Natural disaster deaths in Romania
Deaths in earthquakes
Romanian people who died in prison custody
Politicians from Iași
Inmates of Doftana prison